Ignacio Antonio Mesina Silva (born 16 January 2001) is a Chilean footballer who is currently playing as a midfielder for Coquimbo Unido.

External links
 

2001 births
Living people
Footballers from Santiago
Chilean footballers
Chilean Primera División players
Club Deportivo Palestino footballers
Coquimbo Unido footballers
Association football midfielders